Michael Buchanan (born 6 May 1983) is an Australian cricketer. He played in eleven List A and five Twenty20 matches for Queensland in 2006 and 2007.

See also
 List of Queensland first-class cricketers

References

External links
 

1983 births
Living people
Australian cricketers
Queensland cricketers
Cricketers from Brisbane